These are the United States men's national soccer team all time results:

Results

1916–1929
11 matches played:
5 Wins, 4 Losses, 2 Draws

1930–1949
18 matches played:
5 Wins, 13 Losses, 1 Draw

1950–1959
17 matches played:
3 Wins, 14 Losses, 0 Draws

1960–1969
19 matches played:
5 Wins, 10 Losses, 4 Draws

1970–1979
49 matches played:
9 Wins, 31 Losses, 9 Draws

1980–1989
55 matches played:
19 Wins, 19 Losses, 17 Draws

1990–1999
198 matches played:
71 Wins, 75 Losses, 52 Draws

2000–2009
172 matches played:
98 Wins, 42 Losses, 32 Draws

2010–2019

170 matches played:
88 Wins, 48 Losses, 34 Draws
As of November 19, 2019

2020–2029

44 matches played:
26 Wins, 7 Losses, 11 Draws

Number of matches by U.S. state
Includes all matches on U.S. soil, including friendlies, World Cup Qualifiers, CONCACAF Gold Cup, CONCACAF Nations League, 1994 FIFA World Cup, and others
Updated to January 28, 2023

Results by home stadium
Includes all matches on U.S. soil, including friendlies, World Cup Qualifiers, CONCACAF Gold Cup, CONCACAF Nations League, 1994 FIFA World Cup, and others
Updated to January 28, 2023
Stadiums are listed under their current or most recent name, which does not necessarily match the stadium's name when a given match was played.
 Win % = Number of wins divided by number of games played (draws count as half a win).

References

External links
 USA – International Results
 USA national football team
 USMNT all time matches